André Simard (born 29 April 1945) is a Canadian gymnast. He competed in seven events at the 1972 Summer Olympics.

References

1945 births
Living people
Canadian male artistic gymnasts
Olympic gymnasts of Canada
Gymnasts at the 1972 Summer Olympics
People from Alma, Quebec
Sportspeople from Quebec